Loch Lomond (- 'Lake of the Elms') is a freshwater Scottish loch which crosses the Highland Boundary Fault, often considered the boundary between the lowlands of Central Scotland and the Highlands. Traditionally forming part of the boundary between the counties of Stirlingshire and Dunbartonshire, Loch Lomond is split between the council areas of Stirling, Argyll and Bute and West Dunbartonshire. The Loch forms part of the Loch Lomond and The Trossachs National Park which was established in 2002.

It is the largest lake in Great Britain by surface area; in the United Kingdom, it is surpassed only by Lough Neagh and Lough Erne in Northern Ireland. In the British Isles as a whole there are several larger loughs in the Republic of Ireland.

The loch contains many islands, including Inchmurrin, the largest fresh-water island in the British Isles. Loch Lomond is a popular leisure destination and is featured in the song "The Bonnie Banks o' Loch Lomond". A 2005 poll of Radio Times readers voted Loch Lomond as the sixth greatest natural wonder in Britain.

Formation
The depression in which Loch Lomond lies was carved out by glaciers during the final stages of the last ice age, during a return to glacial conditions known as the Loch Lomond Readvance between 20,000 and 10,000 years ago. The loch lies on the Highland Boundary Fault, and the difference between the Highland and Lowland geology is reflected in the shape and character of the loch: in the north the glaciers dug a deep channel in the Highland schist, removing up to 600 m of bedrock to create a narrow, fjord-like finger lake. Further south the glaciers were able to spread across the softer Lowland sandstone, leading to a wider body of water that is rarely more than 30 m deep. In the period following the Loch Lomond Readvance the sea level rose, and for several periods Loch Lomond was connected to the sea, with shorelines identified at 13, 12 and 9 metres above sea level (the current loch lies at 8 m above sea level).

The change in rock type can be clearly seen at points around the loch, as it runs across the islands of Inchmurrin, Creinch, Torrinch and Inchcailloch and over the ridge of Conic Hill. To the south lie green fields and cultivated land; to the north, mountains.

Islands

The loch contains thirty or more other islands, depending on the water level. Several of them are large by the standards of British bodies of freshwater. Inchmurrin, for example, is the largest island in a body of freshwater in the British Isles. Many of the islands are the remains of harder rocks that withstood the passing of the glaciers; however, as in Loch Tay, several of the islands appear to be crannogs, artificial islands built in prehistoric periods.

English travel writer, H.V. Morton wrote:

Writing 150 years earlier than Morton, Samuel Johnson had however been less impressed by Loch Lomond's islands, writing:

Flora and fauna
The Scottish dock (Rumex aquaticus), sometimes called the Loch Lomond dock, is in Britain unique to the shores of Loch Lomond, being found mostly on around Balmaha on the western shore of the loch. It was first discovered growing there in 1936 (else it grows eastwards through Europe and Asia all the way to Japan).

Powan are one of the commonest fish species in the loch, which has more species of fish than any other loch in Scotland, including lamprey, lampern, brook trout, perch, loach, common roach and flounder. The river lamprey of Loch Lomond display an unusual behavioural trait not seen elsewhere in Britain: unlike other populations, in which young hatch in rivers before migrating to the sea, the river lamprey here remain in freshwater all their lives, hatching in the Endrick Water and migrating into the loch as adults.

The surrounding hills are home to species such as black grouse, ptarmigan, golden eagles, pine martens, red deer and mountain hares. Many species of wading birds and water vole inhabit the loch shore. During the winter months large numbers of geese migrate to Loch Lomond, including over 1% of the entire global population of Greenland white-fronted geese (around 200 individuals), and up to 3,000 greylag geese.

In January 2023 RSPB Scotland released a family of beavers into the southeastern area of the loch under licence from NatureScot. The beaver family, consisting of an adult pair and their five offspring, were translocated from a site in Tayside, where beaver activity was having a negative impact that could not be mitigated.

One of the loch's islands, Inchconnachan, is home to a colony of  red-necked wallabies.

Conservation designations
As well as forming part of the Loch Lomond and the Trossachs National Park, Loch Lomond holds multiple other conservation designations. 428 ha of land in the southeast, including five of the islands, is designated as national nature reserve: the Loch Lomond National Nature Reserve. Seven islands and much of the shoreline form a Special Area of Conservation (SAC), the Loch Lomond Woods. This designation overlaps partially with the national nature reserve, and is protected due to the presence of Atlantic oak woodlands and a population of otters. Four islands and a section of the shoreline are designated as a Special Protection Area due to their importance for breeding capercaillie and visiting Greenland white-fronted geese: this designation overlaps partially with both the national nature reserve and the SAC. Loch Lomond is also a designated Ramsar site, again for the presence of Greenland white-fronted geese.

The loch and its surrounding are designated as a national scenic area, one of forty such areas in Scotland, which have been defined so as to identify areas of exceptional scenery and to ensure its protection from inappropriate development.

History

People first arrived in the Loch Lomond area around 5000 years ago, during the neolithic era. They left traces of their presence at places around the loch, including Balmaha, Luss, and Inchlonaig. Crannogs, artificial islands used as dwellings for over five millennia, were built at points in the loch. The Romans had a fort within sight of the loch at Drumquhassle. The crannog known as "The Kitchen", located off the island of Clairinsh, may have later been used as a place for important meetings by Clan Buchanan whose clan seat had been on Clairinsh since 1225: this usage would be in line with other crannogs such as that at Finlaggan on Islay, used by Clan Donald.

During the Early Medieval period viking raiders sailed up Loch Long, hauled their longboats over at the narrow neck of land at Tarbet, and sacked several islands in the loch.

The area surrounding the loch later become part of the province of Lennox, which covered much of the area of the later county of Dunbartonshire.

Loch Lomond became a popular destination for travellers, such that when James Boswell and Samuel Johnson visited the islands of Loch Lomond on the return from their tour of the Western Isles in 1773, the area was already firmly enough established as a destination for Boswell to note that it would be unnecessary to attempt any description.

Leisure activities

Boating and watersports

Loch Lomond is one of Scotland's premier boating and watersports venues, with visitors enjoying activities including kayaking, Canadian canoeing, paddle boarding, wake boarding, water skiing and wake surfing.

The Maid of the Loch was the last paddle steamer built in Britain. Built on the Clyde in 1953, she operated on Loch Lomond for 29 years. She is now being restored at Balloch pier by the Loch Lomond Steamship Company, a charitable organisation, supported by West Dunbartonshire Council. Cruises also operate from Balloch, Tarbet, Inversnaid, Luss and Rowardennan.

Loch Lomond Rescue Boat provides 24-hour safety cover on the loch. The rescue boat is a volunteer organisation and a registered charity. The national park authority also have other boats on the loch such as The Brigadier. Police Scotland also operates on the loch using RIBs and jet skis and work in conjunction with the national park authority.

The loch has served as the venue for the Great Scottish Swim, which is held each year in August.

Angling
Fly and coarse fishing on Loch Lomond is regulated by the Loch Lomond Angling Improvement Association (LLAIA), who issue permits to members and visiting anglers. The association employ water bailiffs to monitor the actions of anglers on the loch and ensure angling is carried out in accordance with permit conditions.

Land-based activities
Loch Lomond Golf Club is situated on the south-western shore. It has hosted many international events including the Scottish Open. Another golf club, "The Carrick" has opened on the banks of the Loch adjacent to the Loch Lomond Club.

The West Highland Way runs along the eastern bank of the loch, and Inveruglas on the western bank is the terminus of the Cowal Way. The West Loch Lomond Cycle Path runs from Arrochar and Tarbet railway station, at the upper end of the loch, to Balloch railway station, at the south end.

At the southern end of the loch near Balloch is a large visitor and shopping complex named Loch Lomond Shores.

Access and camping
As with all land and inland water in Scotland there is a right of responsible access to the loch and its shoreline for those wishing to participate in recreational pursuits such as walking, camping, swimming and canoeing. In 2017 the national park authority introduced byelaws restricting the right to camp along much of the shoreline of Loch Lomond, due to issues such as litter and anti-social behaviour that were blamed on irresponsible campers. Camping is now restricted to designated areas, and campers are required to purchase a permit to camp within these areas between March and October. The byelaws were opposed by groups such as Mountaineering Scotland and Ramblers Scotland, who argued that they would criminalise camping even where it was carried out responsibly, and that the national park authority already had sufficient powers to address irresponsible behaviour using existing laws.

Transport 

The main arterial route along the loch is the A82 road which runs the length of its western shore, following the general route of the Old Military Road. The road runs along the shoreline in places, but generally keeps some distance to the west of the loch in the "lowland" section to the south. Much of the southern section of the road was widened to a high quality single carriageway standard over the 1980s, at an estimated cost of £24 million (£ million as of ), while Luss itself is now bypassed to the west of the village along a single carriageway bypass constructed between 1990 and 1992. At Tarbet, the A83 branches west to Campbeltown while the A82 continues to the north end of the loch. This part of the road is currently of a lower standard than the sections further south. It is sandwiched between the shoreline of the loch and the mountains to the west, and it runs generally alongside the West Highland Line. At Pulpit rock, the road was single-track, with traffic flow controlled by traffic lights for over 30 years. The road was widened in 2015 as part of a £9 million improvement programme, including a new viaduct bringing the carriageway width to modern standards.

The A811 runs to the south of Loch Lomond between Balloch and Drymen, following the route of another military road at a distance of between 2 and 3 kilometres from the loch. From Drymen the B837 extends north, meeting the eastern shore of the loch at Balmaha where the road terminates. A minor road extends north as far as Rowardennan, a further 11 km away, however beyond this point no road continues along the eastern shore, although there is road access to Inversnaid via another minor road that comes in from Loch Katrine to the east via the northern shore of Loch Arklet. As Loch Arklet is over 100 m above Loch Lomond and less than 2 km to the east this road must descend steeply to reach Inversnaid.

The West Highland railway line joins the western shore of the loch just north of Arrochar and Tarbet railway station. There is a further station alongside the loch at Ardlui. This line was voted the top rail journey in the world by readers of independent travel magazine Wanderlust in 2009, ahead of the iconic Trans-Siberian line in Russia and the Cuzco to Machu Picchu line in Peru. The railway system also reaches the loch at Balloch railway station, which is the terminus of the North Clyde Line.

Several different operators offer ferry services on the loch.

Since 2004 Loch Lomond Seaplanes operates an aerial tour service from its seaplane base near Cameron.

On 22 April 1940, a BOAC Lockheed Model 14 Super Electra (Loch Invar, registration G-AFKD) aircraft flying from Perth Airport to Heston Aerodrome in London crashed at Loch Lomond, killing all five passengers and crew.

Hydroelectricity

The Loch Sloy Hydro-Electric Scheme is situated on the west bank of Loch Lomond. The facility is operated by Scottish and Southern Energy, and is normally in standby mode, ready to generate electricity to meet sudden peaks in demand. It is the largest conventional hydro electric power station in the UK, with an installed capacity of 152.5 MW, and can reach full-capacity within 5 minutes from a standing start. The hydraulic head between Loch Sloy and the outflow into Loch Lomond at Inveruglas is 277 m.

In popular culture

Song

The loch is featured in a well-known song which was first published around 1841. The chorus is:
Oh, ye'll tak the high road, and I'll tak the low road,
And I'll be in Scotland afore ye;
But me and my true love will never meet again
On the bonnie, bonnie banks o' Loch Lomond.
The song has been recorded by many performers over the years. The original author is unknown. One story is that the song was written by a Scottish soldier who awaited death in enemy captivity; in his final letter home, he wrote this song, portraying his home and how much he would miss it. Another tale is that during the Jacobite rising of 1745 a soldier on his way back to Scotland during the 1745–46 retreat from England wrote this song. The "low road" may be a reference to the Celtic belief that if someone died away from his homeland, then the fairies would provide a route of this name for his soul to return home. Within this theory, it is possible that the soldier awaiting death may have been writing either to a friend who was allowed to live and return home, or to a lover back in Scotland.

Other

Loch Lomond (like Loch Ness) is often used as a shorthand for all things Scottish, an image partly reinforced by the self-titled song. An archetype is the Lerner and Loewe musical Brigadoon. The opening lyrics of the song "Almost Like Being in Love" are: "Maybe the sun gave me the power/For I could swim Loch Lomond and be home in half an hour/Maybe the air gave me the drive/For I'm all aglow and alive!"
It is mentioned in the song "You're All the World to Me" from the musical film Royal Wedding in the line: "You're Loch Lomond when autumn is the painter!"
The village of Luss ("Glendarroch") on the shores of the loch was the location for the TV soap Take the High Road, and the loch itself was given the fictional name Loch Darroch for the purpose of the series. 
Luss ("Lios") and the islands nearby were used as the setting for E. J. Oxenham's first book, Goblin Island, published in 1907.
Loch Lomond is also the brand name of the Scotch whisky drunk by Captain Haddock in Hergé's comic book series The Adventures of Tintin, featured prominently in The Black Island. A non-fictional whisky by the same name is produced at the Loch Lomond distillery.
Loch Lomond is the opening track on guitarist Steve Hackett's 2011 album Beyond the Shrouded Horizon.
In The Three Stooges episode "Pardon My Scotch" a gentleman asks 'Are you laddies by any chance from Loch Lomond?', whereupon Curly replies 'No we're from lock jaw'.
One of the road signs in the Merrie Melodies short "My Bunny Lies over the Sea" points to Loch Lomond.
 Spike Milligan created an episode of The Goon Show entitled The Treasure of Loch Lomond. The main character, Neddie Seagoon, discovers he has Scottish heritage and travels to Scotland to claim a fortune owned by his uncle, who discovered a galleon full of treasure at the bottom of the loch.
 In the Mel Brooks film Spaceballs, the character "Snotty" delivers the line "Lock one... lock two... lock three... Loch Lomond..." while locking transporters onto "President Skroob".
 In Santa Cruz County, California, United States, lies Loch Lomond, a small body of water named after Loch Lomond in Scotland. Near Loch Lomond, California, is Ben Lomond which was named by Scot John Burns in 1851.
In Canada, there is a Loch Lomond by Thunder Bay, Ontario, as well as a Hamlet named for the loch in southern Alberta.
 Loch Lomond features as the backdrop for a song sequence in the 1998 Bollywood film Kuch Kuch Hota Hai.
The tune of "Loch Lomond" can be heard in the first 1:13 of the song "Castle Leoch" from the Outlander, Season 1, Volume 1 soundtrack by Bear McCreary.

See also
 Inverarnan Canal – a short waterway that once allowed Loch Lomond steamers to reach Inverarnan.
 List of freshwater islands in Scotland
 List of lochs in Scotland

References and footnotes

Notes

Citations

External links

 Loch Lomond & The Trossachs National Park
 Robert Burns (poet): links to Loch Lomond
 The Loch Lomond Association

 
Lochs of West Dunbartonshire
National scenic areas of Scotland
Ramsar sites in Scotland
Protected areas of West Dunbartonshire
Protected areas of Argyll and Bute
Protected areas of Stirling (council area)
Freshwater lochs of Scotland
Lochs of Argyll and Bute
Lochs of Stirling (council area)
Highland Boundary Fault
2018 European Aquatics Championships
Open water swimming